Fatima Jinnah (1893–1967) was a Pakistani dental surgeon, author, and one of the founders of Pakistan.

Fatima Jinnah may also refer to:

Places
 Fatima Jinnah Colony, a neighborhood in Karachi, Sindh, Pakistan
 Fatima Jinnah Park, a public park in Islamabad, Pakistan

Schools and colleges
 Fatima Jinnah Dental College in Karachi, Pakistan
 Fatima Jinnah Medical University in Lahore, Punjab, Pakistan
 Fatima Jinnah Women University in Rawalpindi, Pakistan
 Khatoon-e-Pakistan Degree College for Women in Karachi, Pakistan

See also
 Fatima (disambiguation)